Tomislav Momirović (born 17 October 1983) is a Serbian businessman and politician serving as minister of internal and foreign trade since 2022. A member of the Serbian Progressive Party (SNS), he served as minister of construction, transport and infrastructure from 2020 to 2022.

Biography

Early life and family 
Momirović was born in 1983 in Belgrade which at the time was a part of the Socialist Federal Republic of Yugoslavia to parents Đorđe and Nada who is from Nikšić. His parents founded the Mona Fashion House in 1989. He graduated from the Faculty of Law, University of Belgrade.

Business career 
Since 2007, Momirović was employed in the company Mona d.o.o. in the position of advisor. The accelerated development of the hotel business began in 2011 with the separation of the company Mona Hotel Management d.o.o. Since the founding of the new company, he has been the General Manager of Mona Hotel Management, which manages three hotels (Hotel Zlatibor Mona on Zlatibor, Hotel Javor in Kušići, Hotel Argo in Belgrade) and one residential building Vila Bella in Budva.

He is a member of the HORES business association, where he has been the president of the HORES assembly (Association of hoteliers and restaurateurs - Business association of hotel and catering industry) since 2013, and from 2009 to 2013 he was the president of the HORES board.

Since 2016, he has been the President of Mona Hotel Management d.o.o. 

Momirović is also known for tweets in which he shares his views on workers, the economy and business, as well as business advice that caused controversy on social networks.

Political career 
On 25 October 2020, it was announced that Momirović will be the new Minister of Construction, Transport and Infrastructure in the Government of Serbia and Prime Minister Ana Brnabić starting from 28 October 2020. President Aleksandar Vučić pointed out that Momirović's candidacy for the Minister of Construction, Transport and Infrastructure, should not be a surprise as "not only did he come from a successful company, but he was willing to accept the blows of various political, and especially economic ignoramuses, even when he opposed an increase in the minimum wage". Momirović said that "Vučić is a historical figure for him and that it is an honor for him to be a part of this story".

References 

1983 births
Living people
Politicians from Belgrade
University of Belgrade Faculty of Law alumni
Businesspeople from Belgrade
Serbian people of Montenegrin descent
Government ministers of Serbia
Construction ministers of Serbia
Serbian Progressive Party politicians